Little Falls Veterans Memorial Park is a baseball stadium in Little Falls, New York. It is home to the Mohawk Valley DiamondDawgs of the Perfect Game Collegiate Baseball League and was the home of Little Falls Mets. The ballpark has a capacity of 2,000 people and opened in 1949.

References

Sports venues in New York (state)
Minor league baseball venues
Baseball venues in New York (state)
Sports venues in Herkimer County, New York
1949 establishments in New York (state)
Sports venues completed in 1949